Diego Haëdo (died 5 July 1608) was a Roman Catholic prelate who served as Archbishop of Palermo (1589–1608) and Bishop of Agrigento (1585–1589).

Biography
On 23 January 1585, Diego Haëdo was appointed by Pope Gregory XIII as Bishop of Agrigento.
On 31 March 1585, he was consecrated bishop by Cesare Marullo, Archbishop of Palermo with Bernardo Gascó, Bishop of Mazara del Vallo, and Desiderio Mezzapica da S. Martino, Bishop of Ugento, as co-consecrators. 
On 14 August 1589, he was appointed by Pope Sixtus V as Archbishop of Palermo. 
He served as Archbishop of Palermo until his death on 5 July 1608.

While bishop, he was the principal consecrator of Juan Corrionero, Bishop of Catania (1589).

References

External links and additional sources
 (for Chronology of Bishops) 
 (for Chronology of Bishops) 
 (for Chronology of Bishops)
 (for Chronology of Bishops) 

1608 deaths
16th-century Roman Catholic bishops in Sicily
17th-century Roman Catholic bishops in Sicily
Bishops appointed by Pope Gregory XIII
Bishops appointed by Pope Sixtus V